Dedrick Roper (born July 31, 1981) is a former American football linebacker. He played college football at Northwood University.

Roper was born in Detroit, Michigan and  raised in Milpitas, California. He began his NFL career with the Pittsburgh Steelers, and played for the St. Louis Rams for all of one week before the Eagles signed him in 2005 season.  He was cut by the Eagles prior to the 2006 season and spent time on the practice squad.  He was re-signed later in the season due to injuries to the defense.

External links
Club profile
ESPN profile

1981 births
American football outside linebackers
Living people
Philadelphia Eagles players
Northwood Timberwolves football players